Nicolai Hanson (24 August 1870 – 14 October 1899) was a Norwegian zoologist and Antarctic explorer. Nicolai Hanson was a member of the Southern Cross Expedition led by Carsten Borchgrevink to Antarctica and he became the first person to be buried in Antarctica.

Biography
Nicolai Hanson was born in Kristiansund in Møre og Romsdal county, Norway. Nicolai Hanson was a graduate of the University of Christiana (now University of Oslo) where he studied zoology under Professor Robert Collett. 

Hanson was a member of the 1899 Southern Cross Expedition to Antarctica which was the first scientific foray to spend considerable time in the Antarctic and to study the region's unique marine life. Hanson had been seriously ill during the voyage from England. After having arrived at the expedition's winter camp at Cape Adare, he was healthy enough to carry out parts of the planned scientific activities. Hanson died on 14 October 1899, apparently of an intestinal disorder, and became the first person to be buried on the Antarctic continent. 

At his request, Hanson was buried in the mountain section above Cape Adare, where a grave was excavated from the mountain. The grave is marked with white quartz stones and a wooden cross and plaque that is attached to a large stone. It is listed on the Antarctic Treaty's list of historic sites and monuments in Antarctica. More recent visitors to Antarctica have reconstructed the Norwegians' desolate and snow-damaged hut that represented the first permanent construction in the southern continent. This empty base camp also stands as a memorial to Nicolai Hanson.

Hanson had married shortly before he traveled to Antarctica. He left a wife and a baby daughter, Johanne Hanson Vogt (1898–1999) who was born after he left on the expedition.

The Antarctic Nototheniidae fish Trematomus nicolai is named after Nicolai Hanson.

See also
Hansen Nunatak

References

Further reading
Borchgrevink, C. E. (1980) First on the Antarctic continent: Being an account of the British Antarctic Expedition, 1898-1900 (McGill-Queen's University Press) 
 Vogt, David (2008) Vår glemte polarhelt - Carsten Borchgrevink og Southern Cross-ekspedisjonen 1898-1900 (Oslo: Aschehoug)

External links

Website dedicated to the Southern Cross Expedition

19th-century Norwegian zoologists
Antarctic expedition deaths
University of Oslo alumni
Explorers of Antarctica
Norwegian polar explorers
1870 births
1899 deaths
People from Kristiansund